A Good Thief Tips His Hat is the debut album of folk rock group Gandalf Murphy and the Slambovian Circus of Dreams. The album's title is an offhand tribute to all of the older groups and artists who have influenced the Circus.

Track listing
All songs written by Joziah Longo.

"Genius" – 5:21
"Silent Revolution" – 5:09
"Radio" – 4:16
"My Girl" – 3:19
"Someday" – 3:21
"Slambovia" – 4:14
"Never Fit" – 5:34
"Alice In Space" – 4:57
"Good Thief" – 4:58
"Circus Of Dreams" – 3:25
"Already Broken" – 9:55

References

1999 debut albums
Gandalf Murphy and the Slambovian Circus of Dreams albums